Dirty O'Neil is a 1974 American film directed by Leon Capetanos and Lewis Teague.

Plot
Jimmy O'Neil (Morgan Paull), a cop in a small California town with a fondness for women, is forced into action when a trio of homicidal thugs invade the town.

Cast
Morgan Paull - Jimmy O'Neill 
Art Metrano - Lassiter 
Pat Anderson - Lizzie 
Jeane Manson - Ruby
Katie Saylor - Vera 
Raymond O'Keefe - Lou 
Tommy J. Huff  - Bennie
Bob Potter - Al 
Sam Laws - Clyde 
Liv Lindeland - Mrs. Crawford 
Kitty Carl - Bobby 
Tara Strohmeier - Mary 
Susan McIver - Helen

See also
 List of American films of 1974

References

External links
 

1970s police films
1974 films
1974 comedy-drama films
1974 directorial debut films
American comedy-drama films
American International Pictures films
American police films
1970s English-language films
Films directed by Lewis Teague
Films scored by Raoul Kraushaar
Films set in California
1970s American films